The Church of St. Nicholas is a Serbian Orthodox church built from 1902 to 1909 in the city of Kotor. On that place the Orthodox Church existed from 1810 to the Christmas Eve in 1896, when it was burnt down in fire.

References

External links
 Митрополија/Слава цркве Светог Николе у Котору

Serbian Orthodox church buildings in Montenegro
Tourist attractions in Kotor
Churches completed in 1909